Eileen Karen Lee Chin Foo Kune, born 29 May 1982 is a Mauritian badminton player and politician. She was the Mauritian sportswoman of the year in 2004 and 2009. She participated in badminton at the 2008 Summer Olympics and made it to the Commonwealth Games in 2002, 2006, and 2010. In 2011, she won the bronze medals at the All-Africa Games in the women's doubles and mixed team event.

Achievements

African Games 
Women's doubles

African Championships 
Women's singles

Women's doubles

Mixed doubles

BWF International Challenge/Series 
Women's singles

Women's doubles

Mixed doubles

  BWF International Challenge tournament
  BWF International Series tournament

References

External links
 

1982 births
Living people
People from Plaines Wilhems District
Mauritian people of Chinese descent
Hakka sportspeople
Mauritian female badminton players
Badminton players at the 2008 Summer Olympics
Olympic badminton players of Mauritius
Badminton players at the 2002 Commonwealth Games
Badminton players at the 2006 Commonwealth Games
Badminton players at the 2010 Commonwealth Games
Commonwealth Games competitors for Mauritius
Competitors at the 2007 All-Africa Games
Competitors at the 2011 All-Africa Games
African Games bronze medalists for Mauritius
African Games medalists in badminton